F.a.n. Frankenstolz Arena (formerly Unterfrankenhalle) is an indoor sporting arena located in Aschaffenburg, Germany.  The capacity of the arena is 5,000 people.  It is currently home to the TV Grosswallstadt handball team.

Handball venues in Germany
Indoor arenas in Germany
Buildings and structures in Aschaffenburg
Sports venues in Bavaria